The OpenAjax Alliance is an industry group devoted to the set of technologies and Web programming techniques known as Ajax.

OpenAjax Alliance membership consists of vendors, open source projects, and companies using Ajax who work with Ajax-based Web technologies. The organization was formed by Ajax companies and open source projects to address issues that require coordination among the many organizations that create and/or use Ajax products and technologies. The alliance does not collect dues nor maintain a staff, and thus all of its activities are the result of voluntary contributions from its 100+ member organizations.

The organization's target customer is the Web developer or IT professional who wants to use Ajax technologies to deliver Web applications with rich user interfaces.

The alliance's technical focus is interoperability across Ajax products and technologies. Interoperability enables customers to integrate  Ajax technologies from different Ajax technology providers.

OpenAjax Alliance engages in educational and communications activities, such as Web pages and white papers posted on its Web site, a wiki, email lists, and press releases.

History and Termination of Formal Operations 
In late 2005, with leadership from IBM, companies brainstormed about how to ensure that Ajax fulfills its potential as the industry standard  application platform based on open technologies. These early discussions came to a climax on Feb. 1, 2006, with the announcement of the "OpenAjax Initiative", whose 15 original companies included BEA, Borland, the Dojo Foundation, Eclipse Foundation, Google, IBM, Laszlo Systems, Mozilla Corporation, Novell, Openwave Systems, Oracle, Red Hat, Yahoo, Zend and Zimbra.

Between February 1 and May 15, 2006, an additional 15 organizations joined "OpenAjax", and the (then) 30 companies held a two-day kickoff meeting in San Francisco to lay out the blue-print. At the meeting, the group decided to establish the OpenAjax Alliance, defined its mission, agreed on an interim organizational process, and established its activities.

The participating companies then defined a governance model via a Members Agreement, and began execution on its marketing/educational and technical activities. The Web site and white paper went live in September 2006. The alliance elected its first Steering Committee in October 2006. The first technical product from the alliance was the OpenAjax Hub, with a draft specification and reference open source implementation completed by December 2006 and integrated a dozen Ajax toolkits on a trial basis as part of the alliance's first OpenAjax InteropFest.

As of May 2008, the organization has 100+ member organizations, including companies such as IBM, Microsoft, Google, Adobe, and Sun, along with Ajax suppliers such as Dojo Foundation, Laszlo Systems, Nexaweb, Tibco and Zimbra, and a small number of individual members.

In October 2012, the Open Ajax Alliance formally terminated its operations.

Members
The list of members of OpenAjax Alliance has been growing steadily. For the list of members, refer to the OpenAjax Alliance home page or the members wiki page.

Among the members are organizations that fall into some of the following categories:
 Ajax toolkit developers (open source and commercial)
 Web browsers (desktop and mobile)
 Enterprise products companies
 Organizations that use Ajax to deliver solutions to their users
 Other community-oriented organizations, such as open source projects or standards organizations, that have a strong interest in Ajax

How OpenAjax Alliance is organized

Steering Committee 
The members of the OpenAjax Alliance elect representatives from seven companies to positions on the OpenAjax Alliance Steering Committee. The Steering Committee manages the affairs of the OpenAjax Alliance on behalf of its member organizations. Among other things, the Steering Committee has final approval on the creation of working groups and specifications.

Working Groups 
The formal materials produced by OpenAjax Alliance are developed within Working Groups. The following two working groups have been formally chartered in accordance with process documents that the members have adopted.

 The Interoperability Working Group is responsible for technical activities in the area of Ajax interoperability, with a focus on client-side runtime issues. The key products coming out of this group will include the specifications that provide the detailed definition of OpenAjax Conformance, such as the specification for the OpenAjax Hub (versions 1.0 and 1.1) and management of the OpenAjax Registry.
 The Marketing Working Group is responsible for the OpenAjax Alliance's communications, educational and promotional activities, promote adoption of open and interoperable Ajax-based Web technologies. The group produces the alliance's white papers, oversees the development of its website, and drives the strategy, high-level definition and industry rollout of the term OpenAjax Conformance.
 The IDE Working Group develops metadata standards that are planned to enable arbitrary Ajax runtime libraries to integrate into arbitrary Ajax developer tools (i.e., IDEs - integrated development environments). The IDE Working Group's metadata standard, OpenAjax Metadata Specification, is also intended to provide an industry standard for mashup widgets. The metadata standard attempts to be an "intermediary" standard which is designed to align closely with popular proprietary formats so that it is possible to transcode to and from the OpenAjax format, and therefore it is not necessary that everyone in the industry support the metadata formats.

Task Forces 
The OpenAjax Alliance establishes task forces to investigate areas of new activity. The task forces are informal groups of members who perform research and then produce recommendations for future alliance activities. There are four task forces:
 The Security Task Force identifies Ajax security issues and investigating what activities should be pursued by the alliance,
 The Mobile Ajax Task Force investigates what OpenAjax Alliance can do to accelerate adoption and developer success in delivering Ajax applications to mobile devices
 The Gadgets Task Force collaborates with the IDE Working Group to ensure that OpenAjax Metadata Specification addresses the needs of the mashup community for an industry standard for mashup widgets.
 The Runtime Advocacy Task Force creates via an open wiki that plans to produce a prioritized feature request list from the Ajax community for what is most important to the Ajax industry from future Web browsers.

Specifications and open source 
Although the OpenAjax Alliance does not intend to become a formal standards body, the alliance does engage in standards-related activities when such activities appear necessary in order to achieve objectives for greater interoperability, vendor choice and promoting innovation. As a result, the OpenAjax Alliance will sometimes develop its own formal specifications and/or open source to fill what it sees as critical industry gaps. In these cases, the expected outcome in the long term is to turn over such work at an appropriate point to a formal standards organization or open-source project.

Members of the OpenAjax Alliance may participate in standards activities within other standards bodies and open source projects to help accelerate the coordinated advancement of OpenAjax technologies and products.

OpenAjax Conformance 
A cornerstone of OpenAjax Alliance activities is the definition of OpenAjax Conformance. OpenAjax Conformance is shorthand for the set of conformance requirements that the OpenAjax Alliance places on Ajax technologies, products and applications. By using Ajax products that support OpenAjax Conformance, OpenAjax claims that IT managers and Web developers would notice the following benefits:
 Seamless integration of multiple Ajax products and technologies within the same Web application, particularly with applications that use mashup techniques
 Greater certainty about product choices, where OpenAjax Conformance plays a similar role in the Ajax community as the Good Housekeeping Seal does with consumer products
 Lower training costs, lower development costs, and faster delivery of Web 2.0 innovations due to industry adoption of common approaches that build from OpenAjax standards
 Interchangeability of OpenAjax Conformant products, such that customers can choose among multiple vendors

To be OpenAjax Conformant, an Ajax product must:
 Support the OpenAjax Hub
 Register its library and JavaScript global objects with the OpenAjax Registry
 Support all relevant Conformance Requirements defined within the OpenAjax Alliance's collection of specifications

OpenAjax hub 
The OpenAjax hub is a small set of JavaScript technologies that addresses critical Ajax runtime interoperability requirements. Version 1.0 of the OpenAjax Hub has the following features:

 Ajax library loading
 A publish/subscribe-based event hub (topic bus)

OpenAjax Hub 2.0 is planned to extend the publish/subscribe features to support secure mashup workflows and client-server communications. For mashups, Hub 2.0 supports the isolation of mashup widgets into secure sandboxes and provides a mediated message bus.

The Alliance develops the OpenAjax Hub Specification and provides an open-source reference implementation.

See also
 Open Mashup Alliance
 graceful degradation
 Progressive enhancement
 EMML

References

Notes

Ajax (programming)